Auskerry (east skerry) is a small island in eastern Orkney, Scotland. It lies in the North Sea south of Stronsay and has a lighthouse, completed in 1866.

Description
A standing stone and mediaeval chapel are signs of early settlement. The island was uninhabited for a time after the automation of the lighthouse in the 1960s. It was previously a popular location for hunting seals.

Auskerry has been inhabited for 30 years by a family who keep a flock of rare North Ronaldsay sheep. There are three small wind turbines and four solar panels on the island, which provide most of the power. After a series of expansions and renovations, the single roomed stone bothy is now a modern house with four bedrooms, kitchen, shower room and living room. The chemical toilet is outdoors due to the complication of installing septic tanks. Mail is delivered from Stronsay, once a month, by a fishing boat.

Lighthouse
The Hastings County, a 116-metre Norwegian cargo ship, ran ashore on north west of Auskerry in 1926 during thick fog. The vessel broke in half and wreckage is spread over a wide area, with the engine on the beach.

The lighthouse lights the north entrance to the Stronsay Firth. It was built in 1866 by engineers David and Thomas Stevenson. It is attached to two flats; the lower one is used all year as a store and the top one is used mainly in summer.

Wildlife
Auskerry is designated a Special Protection Area due to its importance as a nesting area for Arctic tern and European storm petrel; 4.2% of the breeding population of European storm petrels in Great Britain nest on the island.

See also

 Isle of Auskerry (Handmade Business)
List of lighthouses in Scotland
 List of Northern Lighthouse Board lighthouses

References

External links
 Northern Lighthouse Board

Islands of the Orkney Islands
Sites of Special Scientific Interest in Orkney